Joseph Sade (born October 19, 1952) is an American wrestler. He competed in the men's Greco-Roman 57 kg at the 1976 Summer Olympics.

References

External links
 

1952 births
Living people
American male sport wrestlers
Olympic wrestlers of the United States
Wrestlers at the 1976 Summer Olympics
Sportspeople from Detroit